Mariandre Rodas García (born 14 April 1995) is a Guatemalan retired footballer who played as a goalkeeper. She has been a member of the Guatemala women's national team.

International career
Rodas capped for Guatemala at senior level during the 2012 CONCACAF Women's Olympic Qualifying Tournament.

References

1995 births
Living people
Guatemalan women's footballers
Guatemala women's international footballers
Women's association football goalkeepers
Guatemalan women's futsal players